Polska Cerekiew is a village in Kędzierzyn-Koźle County, Opole Voivodeship, in southern Poland. It is the seat of the gmina (administrative district) called Gmina Polska Cerekiew.

The village has a population of 1,429.

History
During World War II, the Germans operated the E253 and E287 forced labour subcamps of the Stalag VIII-B/344 prisoner-of-war camp for Allied POWs in the village.

Sights
The landmarks of Polska Cerekiew are the Renaissance castle and the Church of the Assumption of the Virgin Mary.

Demographics
There is a German minority in the village.

References

Villages in Kędzierzyn-Koźle County